Dallas Denver Bixler (February 17, 1910 – August 13, 1990) was an American gymnast and Olympic champion. He competed at the 1932 Summer Olympics in Los Angeles where he received a gold medal in the horizontal bar.

References

1910 births
1990 deaths
American male artistic gymnasts
Gymnasts at the 1932 Summer Olympics
Olympic gold medalists for the United States in gymnastics
Medalists at the 1932 Summer Olympics